The Battle of Château-Laudran or also known as the Skirmish at Quenelac was a military engagement that took place between 11 and 13 June 1591. Protestant forces of the Royalist French and English led by Prince de Dombes were up against the Catholic League French and Spanish force led by the Duke of Mercœur. The battle took place as part of the French Wars of Religion, and the Anglo–Spanish War (1585–1604). Although the two main armies did not commit to a full on fight, vigorous skirmishing forced the Catholic League French and Spanish to retreat from the field.

Background
In 1590 Duke of Mercœur rebelled against the accession to the throne of France of Henry of Navarre and became the head of the Catholic League of Brittany, aiming to return to restore the autonomy of the former Duchy, and proclaimed protector of the Catholic Church in the region. In May 1591 After the treaty of Greenwich had been signed by France and England, English forces which numbered near 4,000 were despatched under Sir Roger Williams and arrived at Dieppe in Normandy to join John Norreys in Brittany. They were to support Henry in an attempt to pacify the Catholic towns who were supported by the Spanish under Juan del Águila.

The Royalist French commander Prince de Dombes entered Brittany and captured the town of Guingamp from French and Spanish forces. On nearing the town of Morlaix the Prince and John Norreys found that 4,000 Spanish had reinforced the Catholic army under the Duke of Mercouer and were marching towards Morlaix bringing the number to 6,000 foot and 500 horse. The Prince stayed at Guincamp repairing the town's walls which had been damaged in their siege. Mercœur then moved against Châtelaudren and the Prince went out to meet him. After a few discussions about prisoner exchange and giving battle both armies encamped outside the town near Quenelac and the Duke openly vowed a solemn oath to offer battle to the Prince. As soon as he heard he Catholic's league's approach and moved to approach them to make a good place for a battle.

Battle
The next day the Spanish and French force arrived and made battle formation on top a hill near the Prince's chosen site. The prince himself with the advice of John Norreys formed his men into three battalions of which the English infantry made two and the cavalry made the third. The Catholic French and Spanish forces responded by drawing their army to the foot of the hill and placed their artillery on both flanks. The Prince marched his men towards them near a heath and on sighting the troops charged them and drove them back. The Duke then immediately sent 500 French and 200 Spanish to repossess the heath and followed behind was the main bulk of their army.

The Prince then sent 300 English to advance and support the forward body; these were commanded by Captain Anthony Wingfield and the cavalry under Captain Anthony Shirley. At the same time Mercœur sent around 100 musketeers on the left to take a number of houses and a small wood on the edge of the heath, but the Prince then sent 200 Royalists to counter them. The English advanced and at the same time which would met the bulk of the Mercœur's army. This was a surprise to Mercœur's army as they thought that this was a reconnaissance in force. Instead the English attacked sending the cavalry fleeing, leaving the infantry left in the open where many were killed or captured. The rest tried to flee back to their lines and were eventually driven from the field into the bulk of the Catholic army who promptly set up defensive positions and then sent out musketeers.

The following day more skirmishing took place where the French and Spanish infantry sent out musketeers in strength to test the Royalist line. In this counter attack they were however routed by a cavalry charge led by Anthony Shirley who took many prisoners. In the confused fighting the French colonel of infantry was captured and the Chief Marshall of Spaniards Don Rodrigo was killed, whilst Shirley had his horse shot from under him.

During the early hours of 13 June after some light skirmishes and cannonades, Mercœur being far too cautious finally retreated with his canon to Quenelac and the Prince's army held the field.

Aftermath
The Prince had held field in the possession of the French and English. He realised that a full major battle had been avoided but did not pursue the League Spanish army. The prince too retired to Guincamp and reinforced the garrison as well as strengthening the defences.

Casualties were heavy amongst the Spanish and French forces, 400 were lost, including 60 Spaniards and 200 Frenchman taken prisoner.

On June 26 Mercœur in frustration disbanded his army for the fruit harvest to avoid disease. 600 of Norreys’ troops were transferred to Earl of Essex's force who took part Henry IV's unsuccessful attempt to capture Rouen. At the end February 1592, Norreys returned to England, not setting foot in France for another two years. Shirley as a result of his actions was knighted by Henry IV, an event which brought upon him the displeasure of Queen Elizabeth I and a short imprisonment.

References
Citations

Bibliography
 
 
 
 
 
 
 

Conflicts in 1591
History of Catholicism in France
Battles of the French Wars of Religion
Battles involving France
Battles involving Spain
Battles involving England
Military history of Brittany
History of Côtes-d'Armor
1591 in France